Alan Carlos Gomes da Costa (born 22 February 1983), commonly known as Alanzinho, is a Brazilian retired footballer who played as an attacking midfielder.

His former clubs include Flamengo (2002–2003), America-RJ (2004), Paranoá (2005) and Stabæk (2005–2009).

Club career

Stabæk
He played an important part during Stabæk's title winning season in 2008, winning both NISO's player of the year award – an award where every league player cast a vote – and the Kniksen midfield of the year award.

On 15 May 2008, Alanzinho penned a three-year deal with Stabæk.

Trabzonspor 

On 27 January 2009, Stabæk officially confirmed that they had agreed with Trabzonspor and that Alanzinho is free to go to Turkey to undergo a medical and agree on personal terms. He signed an official contract for Trabzonspor on 28 January 2009, his contract lasts for  years until the summer of 2012.

He scored his first goal against Galatasaray.

Balıkesirspor 

In July 2014, he signed a new contract with the newly promoted team, Balıkesirspor. The contract is for 2 years.

Club statistics

Honours

Club
Stabæk
 Tippeligaen (1): 2008

Trabzonspor
 Turkish Cup (1): 2010
 Turkish Super Cup (1): 2010

Individual
Kniksen Award:
Midfielder of the Year in 2007
Midfielder of the Year in 2008
NISO Player's player of the year Award

References

External links

 
 

Living people
1983 births
Association football midfielders
Brazilian expatriate footballers
Expatriate footballers in Norway
Brazilian expatriate sportspeople in Norway
Brazilian expatriate sportspeople in Turkey
Expatriate footballers in Turkey
CR Flamengo footballers
America Football Club (RJ) players
Stabæk Fotball players
Trabzonspor footballers
Balıkesirspor footballers
Campeonato Brasileiro Série A players
Eliteserien players
Norwegian First Division players
Süper Lig players
TFF First League players
Kniksen Award winners
Gaziantep F.K. footballers
Footballers from Rio de Janeiro (city)
Brazilian footballers